Thales Leites Lourenço (born 6 September 1981) is a retired Brazilian mixed martial artist best known for competing in the middleweight division of the Ultimate Fighting Championship.

Mixed martial arts career

Early career
Leites made his mixed martial arts debut at Shooto Brazil in 2003, defeating Felipe Arinelli by arm-triangle choke submission. Leites would win his next two fights in Vitória before making his debut in the United States in Hawaii's Rumble on the Rock promotion in 2005, where he defeated Adam Roland in his fourth consecutive mixed martial arts victory.

After a successful outing in the U.S., Leites returned to Brazil to fight Gustavo Machado, who was coming off two wins in the Japanese Pancrase organization. Leites defeated the more experienced Machado by submission in the third round, and was invited back to Rumble on the Rock to fight Hawaiian Ronald Jhun in September. Despite fighting a hometown favorite, Leites notched his sixth victory, defeating Jhun by technical knockout in the later half of the fight.

Although Leites held an unblemished record, he did not gain much mainstream exposure until his bouts with Osami Shibuya in Japan's MARS promotion, and Jose Landi-Jons in Brazil's Jungle Fight promotion. In both fights, Leites was much less experienced than his opponents; about Landi-Jons, Leites admitted, "He was already famous when I was not even interested" in mixed martial arts. Despite the experience disparity, Leites defeated both opponents, scoring a unanimous decision over Shibuya, and submitting Landi-Jons with an arm-triangle choke, increasing Leites' professional record to 9–0.

Ultimate Fighting Championship
In September 2006, it was announced that Leites would make his UFC debut against veteran middleweight Nate Marquardt at Ortiz vs. Shamrock 3: The Final Chapter.  However, due to issues with his travel documentation, Leites was not able to compete at the event as planned.

Leites made his debut at The Ultimate Fighter 4 Finale, where he lost a unanimous decision to Danish kickboxer Martin Kampmann.

In his next fight, at UFC 69, he defeated The Ultimate Fighter 4 contestant Pete Sell.  Leites next earned a submission victory over Floyd Sword at The Ultimate Fighter 5 Finale by arm-triangle choke.  He was then scheduled to fight Ryan Jensen at UFC 74.  Leites accepted the fight after Travis Lutter, Jensen's original opponent, was forced to withdraw from the event.  Leites defeated Jensen by armbar submission in the first round, raising his UFC record to 3 wins, 1 loss.

Leites was scheduled to fight Nate Marquardt at UFC 81, but withdrew from the bout after breaking his hand in training.  Leites finally fought Marquardt at UFC 85, winning by a controversial split decision due to point deductions in the 2nd and 3rd rounds to Marquardt.

On the undercard of UFC 90 Leites was able to earn a  submission victory over heavy-handed Drew McFedries. This win would prove to be valuable as Leites was able to earn number one contendership to the UFC middleweight title against current champion Anderson Silva on UFC 97 in Montreal. Leites was defeated by Silva via unanimous decision in what is called by many to be the worst fight in MMA history. On his return to the octagon, Leites was defeated again via a controversial split decision against Italian Alessio Sakara. The fight caused a lot of booing which started during the first round and continued throughout the fight. The lack of action during the fight at one point caused referee Marc Goddard to state to the fighters that Mixed Martial Arts was a "contact sport".

Following the loss, Leites, along with George Roop and Tamdan McCrory, were cut from the UFC. Just days later, Dana White revealed to Yahoo Sports his unawareness of McCrory and Leites' release from the UFC and expressed his intentions to reverse those actions. Shortly after, White decided not to reverse the decisions.

Post-UFC
Leites earned a decision victory over Dean Lister at MFC 23 on 4 December 2009, a submission victory over Rico Washington at Bitetti Combat MMA 6 on 25 February 2010, and a submission victory over Jesse Taylor at MFC 25 on 7 May 2010.

He was scheduled to face Falaniko Vitale on 14 August 2010, in California, but instead faced Matt Horwich at the event and suffered the first submission loss of his career.

In the Superior Challenge promotion, Leites submitted top European Middleweight Tor Troéng at Superior Challenge 6 on 29 October 2010, and fought Jeremy Horn to a split decision victory at Superior Challenge 7 on 30 April 2011.

Return to the UFC
After winning three in a row, Leites was signed by the UFC and made his return against Tom Watson on 3 August 2013 at UFC 163. He won the fight via dominant unanimous decision.

Leites next faced Ed Herman on 16 November 2013 at UFC 167. He won the fight via unanimous decision.

Leites faced Trevor Smith on 11 April 2014 at UFC Fight Night 39. He won the fight via TKO in the first round.

Leites faced Francis Carmont on 23 August 2014 at UFC Fight Night 49. He won the fight via second-round knockout. The win also earned Leites his first Performance of the Night bonus award.

Leites then faced Tim Boetsch on 31 January 2015 at UFC 183. He won the fight via technical submission due to an arm-triangle choke in the second round.  The win also earned Leites Fight of the Night and Performance of the Night bonus awards.

Leites faced Michael Bisping on 18 July 2015 at UFC Fight Night 72. He lost the fight via split decision.

Leites faced Gegard Mousasi on 27 February 2016 at UFC Fight Night 84. He lost the fight via unanimous decision.

Leites next faced Chris Camozzi on 6 August 2016 at UFC Fight Night 92. He won the fight by submission due to a rear-naked choke in the third round.

Leites faced Krzysztof Jotko on 19 November 2016 at UFC Fight Night 100. He lost the fight via unanimous decision.

Leites faced Sam Alvey on 22 April 2017 at UFC Fight Night 108. He won the fight via unanimous decision.

Leites faced Brad Tavares on 7 October 2017 at UFC 216. He lost the fight by unanimous decision.

Leites faced Jack Hermansson on 12 May 2018 at UFC 224. He lost the fight via TKO in the third round, marking the first time he's been finished by TKO in his professional MMA career.

Leites faced Héctor Lombard on 22 September 2018 at UFC Fight Night 137. He won the fight via unanimous decision and  Leites announced his retirement after the fight.

Personal life
Leites and his girlfriend had a daughter named Valentina in July 2009.

Championships and accomplishments
Ultimate Fighting Championship
Performance of the Night (Two times) vs. Francis Carmont and Tim Boetsch 
Submission of the Night (One time) vs. Ryan Jensen 
Fight of the Night (One time) vs. Tim Boetsch
Tied (with Demian Maia, Rousimar Palhares and Antônio Carlos Júnior) for second most submission wins in the UFC Middleweight division history (five)
Superior Challenge
SC Middleweight Championship (One time)
MMAJunkie.com
2015 January Submission of the Month vs. Tim Boetsch

Mixed martial arts record

|-
|Win
|align=center|28–9
|Héctor Lombard
|Decision (unanimous)
|UFC Fight Night: Santos vs. Anders 
|
|align=center|3
|align=center|5:00
|São Paulo, Brazil
|
|- 
|Loss
|align=center|27–9
|Jack Hermansson
|TKO (punches)
|UFC 224
|
|align=center|3
|align=center|2:10
|Rio de Janeiro, Brazil
|
|-
|Loss
|align=center|27–8
|Brad Tavares
|Decision (unanimous)
|UFC 216 
|
|align=center|3
|align=center|5:00
|Las Vegas, Nevada, United States
|
|-
|Win
|align=center|27–7 
|Sam Alvey
|Decision (unanimous)
|UFC Fight Night: Swanson vs. Lobov
|
|align=center|3
|align=center|5:00
|Nashville, Tennessee, United States
|
|-
|Loss
|align=center|26–7 
|Krzysztof Jotko
|Decision (unanimous)
|UFC Fight Night: Bader vs. Nogueira 2
|
|align=center|3
|align=center|5:00
|São Paulo, Brazil
|  
|-
|Win
|align=center|26–6
|Chris Camozzi 
|Submission (rear-naked choke)
|UFC Fight Night: Rodríguez vs. Caceres 
|
|align=center|3
|align=center|2:58
|Salt Lake City, Utah, United States
|
|-
|Loss
|align=center|25–6
|Gegard Mousasi
|Decision (unanimous)
|UFC Fight Night: Silva vs. Bisping
|
|align=center|3
|align=center|5:00
|London, England
|
|-
|Loss
|align=center|25–5
|Michael Bisping
|Decision (split)
|UFC Fight Night: Bisping vs. Leites
|
|align=center|5
|align=center|5:00
|Glasgow, Scotland
|
|-
|Win
|align=center|25–4
|Tim Boetsch
|Technical Submission (arm-triangle choke)
|UFC 183
|
|align=center|2
|align=center|3:45
|Las Vegas, Nevada, United States
|
|-
|Win
|align=center|24–4
|Francis Carmont
|KO (punches)
|UFC Fight Night: Henderson vs. dos Anjos
|
|align=center|2
|align=center|0:20
|Tulsa, Oklahoma, United States
|
|-
|Win
|align=center|23–4
|Trevor Smith
|TKO (punches)
|UFC Fight Night: Nogueira vs. Nelson
|
|align=center|1
|align=center|0:45
|Abu Dhabi, United Arab Emirates
|
|-
|Win
|align=center|22–4
|Ed Herman
|Decision (unanimous)
|UFC 167
|
|align=center|3
|align=center|5:00
|Las Vegas, Nevada, United States
|
|-
|Win
|align=center|21–4
|Tom Watson
|Decision (unanimous)
|UFC 163
|
|align=center|3
|align=center|5:00
|Rio de Janeiro, Brazil
|
|-
|Win
|align=center|20–4
|Matt Horwich
|Submission (arm-triangle choke)
|Amazon Forest Combat 2
|
|align=center|2
|align=center|4:39
|Manaus, Brazil
|
|-
|Win
|align=center|19–4
|Jeremy Horn
|Decision (split)
|Superior Challenge 7
|
|align=center|3
|align=center|5:00
|Stockholm, Sweden
|
|-
|Win
|align=center|18–4
|Tor Troéng
|Submission (rear-naked choke)
|Superior Challenge 6
|
|align=center|2
|align=center|3:33
|Stockholm, Sweden
|
|-
|Loss
|align=center|17–4
|Matt Horwich
|Submission (rear-naked choke)
|Powerhouse World Promotions: War on the Mainland
|
|align=center|4
|align=center|0:44
|Irvine, California, United States
|
|-
|Win
|align=center|17–3
|Jesse Taylor
|Submission (triangle choke) 
|MFC 25
|
|align=center|1
|align=center|2:27
|Edmonton, Alberta, Canada
|
|-
|Win
|align=center|16–3
|Rico Washington
|Submission (arm-triangle choke)
|Bitetti Combat MMA 6
|
|align=center|1
|align=center|2:40
|Brasília, Brazil
|
|-
|Win
|align=center|15–3
|Dean Lister
|Decision (unanimous)
|MFC 23
|
|align=center|3
|align=center|5:00
|Edmonton, Alberta, Canada
|
|-
|Loss
|align=center|14–3
|Alessio Sakara
|Decision (split)
|UFC 101
|
|align=center|3
|align=center|5:00
|Philadelphia, Pennsylvania, United States
|
|-
|Loss
|align=center|14–2
|Anderson Silva
|Decision (unanimous)
|UFC 97
|
|align=center|5
|align=center|5:00
|Montreal, Quebec, Canada
|
|-
|Win
|align=center|14–1
|Drew McFedries
|Submission (rear-naked choke)
|UFC 90
|
|align=center|1
|align=center|1:18
|Rosemont, Illinois, United States
|
|-
|Win
|align=center|13–1
|Nate Marquardt
|Decision (split)
|UFC 85
|
|align=center|3
|align=center|5:00
|London, England
|
|-
|Win
|align=center|12–1
|Ryan Jensen
|Submission (armbar)
|UFC 74
|
|align=center|1
|align=center|3:47
|Las Vegas, Nevada, United States
|
|-
|Win
|align=center|11–1
|Floyd Sword
|Submission (arm-triangle choke)
|The Ultimate Fighter 5 Finale
|
|align=center|1
|align=center|3:50
|Las Vegas, Nevada, United States
|
|-
|Win
|align=center|10–1
|Pete Sell
|Decision (unanimous)
|UFC 69
|
|align=center|3
|align=center|5:00
|Houston, Texas, United States
|
|-
|Loss
|align=center|9–1
|Martin Kampmann
|Decision (unanimous)
|The Ultimate Fighter 4 Finale
|
|align=center|3
|align=center|5:00
|Las Vegas, Nevada, United States
|
|-
|Win
|align=center|9–0
|José Landi-Jons
|Technical Submission (arm-triangle choke)
|Jungle Fight 6
|
|align=center|1
|align=center|2:40
|Manaus, Brazil
|
|-
|Win
|align=center|8–0
|Osami Shibuya
|Decision (unanimous)
|MARS
|
|align=center|3
|align=center|5:00
|Tokyo, Japan
|
|-
|Win
|align=center|7–0
|Jason Guida
|Submission (armbar)
|Ultimate Warriors Combat 1
|
|align=center|1
|align=center|1:38
|Honolulu, Hawaii, United States
|
|-
|Win
|align=center|6–0
|Ronald Jhun
|TKO (doctor stoppage)
|ROTR: Qualifiers
|
|align=center|3
|align=center|0:32
|Honolulu, Hawaii, United States
|
|-
|Win
|align=center|5–0
|Gustavo Machado
|Submission (arm-triangle choke)
|Storm Samurai 8
|
|align=center|3
|align=center|N/A
|Brasília, Brazil
|
|-
|Win
|align=center|4–0
|Adam Roland
|Submission (armbar)
|Rumble on the Rock 7
|
|align=center|1
|align=center|0:49
|Honolulu, Hawaii, United States
|
|-
|Win
|align=center|3–0
|Flavio Luiz Moura
|Submission (arm-triangle choke)
|Vitoria Extreme Fighting 1
|
|align=center|N/A
|align=center|N/A
|Vitória, Brazil
|
|-
|Win
|align=center|2–0
|Lucio Linhares
|TKO (corner stoppage)
|Vitoria Extreme Fighting 1
|
|align=center|1
|align=center|N/A
|Vitória, Brazil
|
|-
|Win
|align=center|1–0
|Felipe Arinelli
|Submission (arm-triangle choke)
|Shooto Brazil: Welcome to Hell
|
|align=center|2
|align=center|N/A
|Rio de Janeiro, Brazil
|

See also
 List of current UFC fighters
 List of male mixed martial artists

References

External links

1981 births
Living people
Brazilian male mixed martial artists
Middleweight mixed martial artists
Mixed martial artists utilizing Brazilian jiu-jitsu
Mixed martial artists utilizing Muay Thai
Brazilian Muay Thai practitioners
Brazilian practitioners of Brazilian jiu-jitsu
Sportspeople from Niterói
People awarded a black belt in Brazilian jiu-jitsu
Ultimate Fighting Championship male fighters